The WUSA Founding Player Allocation distributed 24 players from the United States women's national soccer team to the eight founding teams of the WUSA.  The initial allocation list was announced on May 24, 2000 and consisted primarily of players from the American team that won the 1999 FIFA Women's World Cup the previous year.

Process
The league allocated three players from the list of Founding Players based on three criteria:
 player's interest in playing for a particular team
 player's hometown or college town
 competitive balance amongst the teams

2000 Allocation results

1 A shoulder injury ruled Akers out of the season, so she took on a spokesperson role for WUSA while hoping to return to playing the following season. When the Orlando franchise moved to Carolina, Carla Overbeck—who had intended to sit out 2001 in order to have another child—agreed to replace Akers as one of the team's allocated players.

See also

 List of top-division football clubs in CONCACAF countries
 List of professional sports teams in the United States and Canada
 List of WUSA drafts
 2001 WUSA season

References

External links
 WUSA Website (archive.org)
 WUSA on Fun While It Lasted

Founding Player Allocation
Women's United Soccer Association drafts